Bulandy District is a district of Aqmola Region in northern Kazakhstan. The administrative center of the district is the town of Makinsk. Population:

References

Districts of Kazakhstan
Akmola Region